Wallis and Futuna competed at the 2011 Pacific Games in Nouméa, New Caledonia between August 27 and September 10, 2011. As of June 28, 2011 Wallis and Futuna has listed 185 competitors.

Athletics

Wallis and Futuna has qualified 8 athletes.

Men
Tony Aloisio To Falelavaki -  Javelin Throw Parasport Ambulent
Aukusitino Hoatau -  Discus Throw
Petelo Sanele Masei
Yves Mavaetau -  Javelin Throw Parasport Ambulent
Sosefo Hega Panuve -  Javelin Throw
Vahaafenua Tipotio -  Javelin Throw
Valentin Tuhimutu

Women
Romina Ugatai -  Javelin Throw

Canoeing

Wallis and Futuna has qualified 13 athletes.

Men
Palasio Falevalu -  V6 500m,  V12 500m
Sosefo Kanimoa -  V6 500m,  V12 500m
Tominiko Gilbert Tuilofaga Lie -  V6 500m,  V12 500m
Kevin Mafutuna -  V6 500m
Olivier Ulutuipalelei -  V6 500m,  V12 500m
Jacky Joe Tuakoifenua -  V1 500m,  V6 500m,  V12 500m
James Natanaele Kavakava -  V12 500m
Joselito Latunina -  V12 500m
Jerome Laufilitoga -  V12 500m
Kusitino Lautoa -  V12 500m
Soane Polutele -  V12 500m
Sosefo Tulitau -  V12 500m
Feletino Emanuele Mafutuna -  V 12 500m

Golf

Wallis and Futuna has qualified 2 athletes.

Women
Malia Potapu Maitre
Marie Chanel Mistycki

Karate

Wallis and Futuna has qualified 3 athletes.

Men
Olivier Maleselino Vegi
Jurgen Shan Vegi
Raphael Galuofeioa

Powerlifting

Wallis and Futuna has qualified 5 athletes.

Men
Tominico Kaikilekofe
Patelisio Paagalua
Mateo Mailagi
Soane Franco Fotutata
Aukusitino Hoatau

Rugby Sevens

Wallis and Futuna has qualified a men's team.  Each team can consist of a maximum of 12 athletes.

Men
Patelisio Pelo
Nive Atuhakevalu Vili
Jean-Louis Vakauliafa
Keleto Saliga
Leone Tini
Kafoalogologofolau Falemaa
Ronald Moeliku
Simione Filituulaga
Giovanny Paagalua
Leonale Christophe Muliloto
Manoahi Kauvaitupu
Mateasi Lamata

Sailing

Wallis and Futuna has qualified 4 athletes.

Jean Jacques Halakilikili
Ohokava Visesio Tuulaki
Jean Nukufolau Chardigny
Francis Salaika Tuulaki

Taekwondo

Wallis and Futuna has qualified 3 athletes.

Men
Willy Tuhuhufo Vegi
Jurgen Shan Vegi -  -74kg
Paino Talikilagi Mulikihaamea -  -80kg

Tennis

Wallis and Futuna has qualified 2 athletes.

Men
Eric Fuahea

Women
Malia Tokotuu

Volleyball

Indoor Volleyball

Wallis and Futuna has qualified a men's and women's team.  Each team can consist of a maximum of 12 members.

Men -  Team Tournament
Tomaakino Matavalu
Boris Takaniko
Vakakula Takaniko
Akelausi Nau
Fakafetai Iseso Tupou
Jean-Philippe Sione
Meliuahel Maile Takaniko
Vitali Petelo Tupou
Tali Ite Ofa Tiniloa
Petelo Faipule Kolokilagi
Glenn Tevila Tuifua
Petelo Malivao

Women
Tauhala Tafilagi
Lenaic Koleti Felomaki
Melodie Uhilamoafa
Sofia Lavaka
Morina Tuakoifenua
Marie Stella Vanai
Malia Tameha
Olivia Tuia
Gladys Pressense
Siolesia Lape
Malia Ugalei Likuvalu

Weightlifting

Wallis and Futuna has qualified 1 athletes.

Men
Kaikilekofe Israel Setino

References

2011 in Wallis and Futuna
Nations at the 2011 Pacific Games
Wallis and Futuna at the Pacific Games